Willhoit is an unincorporated community in Ozark County, Missouri, United States. It is located approximately eight miles north of Gainesville, just east of Route 5 on a county road. The community lies in a valley at the junction of Ludecker and Barren Fork Creeks.

History
In 1908, a post office was established in the community and named Wilhoit after J. W. Wilhoit. In 1895, the post office had been named Arp after a storekeeper. A later postmaster changed the spelling to Willhoit. The post office closed in 1974.

References

Unincorporated communities in Ozark County, Missouri
Unincorporated communities in Missouri